Amir-e-Paigah-e-Asman Jahi, Moin-ud-Daula Bahadur Innayath Jung, commonly known as Sir Nawab muhammed Moin uddin khan born at Basheer Bagh Palace in 1891 was an Indian nobleman and member of the Paigah Nobility. The Paigah Nobility was the second most powerful family in Deccan Hyderabad State maintaining their own court and army bound with Asaf Jahi dynasty by matrimonial relationship, Moin-ud-daula and his father Asman Jah was one of those fortunate individuals to whom it has been given by fate to write their names large in the annals of their country, Moin-ud-daula's father Asman Jah who served as co-regent and Prime Minister of Hyderabad created several marvalous architect through out the city maintained his own army court in his own domain Shamshabad, was granted the title of Order of the Indian Empire, 

Moin-ud_Daula was educated at Nizam College MEC, he was the Minister of Industry from 1923–1924 and later retired to join army of the Asaf Jahi dynasty as army deputy From 1924–1927. He was granted the title of Innayat Jung in 1919 and the title of Amir-e-Paiagh Asman Jahi in 1927, Paigah Amirs held the honorary morchal (standard) behind the Nizam. Moin-ud-Daula was one of the most trusted close ally of Mir Osman Ali Khan he was also the part of executive Council of H.E.H. the Nizam of Hyderabad, he was also adviser and counsler to Nizam and he was the only person to have his own court, army and domain he also possed the largest estate in entire state of Hyderabad State formally known as Deccan 2nd to non but Nizam, Moin-ud-was also of the richest nobles in the world at that time, tales of his father's achievement and wealth are well known and his loyalty to the Asaf Jahi dynasty, there countless book in which it is describe by Noble englishmen about both Moin-ud-Daula and his father Asman Jah as exceptional people of noble character and people of sincerity, piety and honour,

Career 
Nawab Moin-ud-Daula Bahadur founded Moin-ud-Dowlah Gold Cup Tournament he was very fond of cricket and founded Patron Hyderabad Cricket Association 1934-1941.he was also President of Saroornagar Cricket Club, and was honoured with K.C.I.E after serving in the Asaf Jahi dynasty army.  

he was the Minister of Industry from 1923–1924 his contribution to the education system and business industry is greatly appreciated.

Medal of Honour 
Nizam’s Silver Jubilee (1937)

Delhi Durbar silver (1911)

Silver Jubilee (1935)

Coron (1937)

Estate and Palaces 
Basheer Bagh Palace was owned by Nawab Moin-ud-daula and also his father's Asman Jah's Asman Garh Palace and one of the most famous Asman Jah Devdi, saroornagar devdi, and many properties in Somajiguda Shamshabad Basheerbagh Vikarabad and countless many more villages Areas and the district of Moinabad, Ranga Reddy which was also named after Nawab Moin-ud-Daula Bahadur

Personal life 

Nawab Sir Moin-ud-Daula Bahadur had 14 sons and 7 daughters; he was the grandson of Afzal-ud-Daulah and son of Asman Jah his mother was the princess of the state, which granted him a lot of power and wealth and Influence. Moin-ud-Daula issued serval sons and daughters including Nawab zaheer yar Jung,(residence Paigah House, Begumpet) Nawab Ifteqar Uddin Khan, Nawab Bahseer Jung, Nawab Iqbal uddin Khan(residence Sarooragar palace)      

he has several Grandosns and Granddaughters but some are very famous     

Nawab Fakhr Uddin Khan, Nawab Wali Yar Jung, Nawab sahebzade Hyder uddin Khan, sahebzadi Nikhat Unnisa Begum,  Sahibzadi Iqbal unnisa Begum. m. Sahibzada Mir Muhammad Nusrath ‘Ali Khan, son of Prince Hashim Jah

References 

 Outline Of A Metaphysics
  List Of Leading Officials Nobles And Personages
 1936 Hyderabad Directory
 
 

1891 births
1941 deaths
Politicians from Hyderabad, India
People from Hyderabad, India
Knights Commander of the Order of the Indian Empire